the Noise was a monthly newspaper serving the cities of Flagstaff, Prescott, Sedona, Cottonwood, Jerome, Clarkdale, and Winslow in northern Arizona.  Founded in 1993 by four high school seniors whose rural hometown's budget cuts lead to the cancellation of the student newspaper, it has since expanded its circulation and editorial to encompass a large swath of northern Arizona. The last issue of the Noise ran in December 2017.

As an independent nonprofit publication, the Noise contained a variety of news, arts, music, poetry, fiction and commentary.

It had housed in-depth coverage of the controversial issue of snowmaking on the San Francisco Peaks by Arizona Snowbowl and the subsequent appeal from Native American tribes to the Ninth Circuit Court of Appeals.  It has also covered issues such as water rights, education reform, affordable housing, and immigration law.

External links 
 Official website

Newspapers published in Arizona
Flagstaff, Arizona